Local elections in the Indian state of Telangana were held in 2020 for 11 municipal corporations and 120 municipalities. Elections for 9 municipal corporations and 120 municipalities were held on 22 January 2020. Elections for Karimnagar Municipal Corporation were held on 24 January 2022 whereas elections for the Greater Hyderabad Municipal Corporation were held on 1 December 2022.

Background 
Most previous elections for the urban local bodies were held from 2014-2016. In 2014, the Telangana Rashtra Samithi won 3 municipal corporations and 22 municipalities, followed by the Indian National Congress with 19 municipalities, the Telugu Desam Party with 4 municipalities, the Bharatiya Janata Party with 3 municipalities, and the All India Majlis-e-Ittehadul Muslimeen with 1 municipality. In 2016, the TRS had swept the GHMC bagging 99 out of 150 wards, a clear two-third majority.

Results

By municipal corporation 
Greater Hyderabad Municipal CorporationKarimnagar Municipal CorporationRamagundam Municipal Corporation

References 

Telangana
Local elections in Telangana